Winnie Brinks (born February 17, 1968) is an American politician who has served as a member of the Michigan Senate since 2019. A member of the Democratic Party, Brinks assumed office as Majority Leader of the Senate on January 1, 2023; she is the first woman to ever hold the office, and the first Democrat to do so since William Faust left office in 1984. Brinks previously served in the Michigan House of Representatives from 2013 to 2018, worked as an executive at a non-profit before seeking office. In the House, she served on the Workforce and Talent Development, Education, Health Policy, and Tourism and Outdoor Recreation Committees. She also serves as chair of the Progressive Women's Caucus, a non-profit organization that addresses concerns about women's health, pay equity, economic security and gender violence.

Education and early career 
Brinks earned a bachelor's degree in Spanish from Calvin College.  For several years she was Executive Director of One Way House Inc., a residential facility for non-violent female offenders.   She also was a caseworker at The Source, an employee support organization.

Political career 
Brinks was recruited to run for office after Roy Schmidt, who had previously been elected to the Michigan House as a Democrat, switched to the Republican Party at the deadline to file for re-election, leaving no legitimate Democratic candidate on the primary ballot. Brinks ran in the primary as a write-in candidate, exceeding the 1,000 votes required to win the Democratic nomination. She then defeated Schmidt in the November general election. In 2014, she was re-elected, defeating Republican challenger Donijo DeJonge, and in 2016 she defeated Republican challenger Casey J. O'Neill.

Due to term limits, Brinks was unable to run for re-election in 2018, and instead ran successfully for the 29th district of the Michigan Senate. Brinks defeated fellow state representative Chris Afendoulis, a Republican, and Libertarian and Working Class Party candidates. She succeeded Dave Hildenbrand, also a Republican, who was required by term limits to vacate the seat.

After the 2022 Michigan Senate election, where the Democratic Party won control of the State Senate, Brinks was chosen as the majority leader of the Michigan Senate Democrats. Brinks is the first female majority leader of the State Senate.

References

External links
Legislative website
Campaign website
 

1968 births
21st-century American politicians
21st-century American women politicians
Calvin University alumni
Democratic Party members of the Michigan House of Representatives
Democratic Party Michigan state senators
Living people
Politicians from Grand Rapids, Michigan
Women state legislators in Michigan